Sólo Para Mujeres (English: Only for Women) is a compilation album by Bachata group Aventura. It was part of a series of albums with the same title from different artists, such as Gilberto Santa Rosa, Víctor Manuelle, Ricardo Arjona, and Alexis & Fido among others.

Tacklist

Charts

Weekly charts

Year-end charts

References

External links
Aventura official site

2014 compilation albums
Aventura (band) compilation albums